The Cerrado languages (also referred to as Amazonian Jê) are a branch of the Jê languages constituted by the Goyaz Jê languages and Akuwẽ (Central Jê).

Sound changes from Proto-Jê to Proto-Cerrado
The occurrence of the consonant */g/ in Proto-Cerrado (as in */g/õt ‘to sleep’, */g/õ ‘to give’, */g/aj’ ‘you’) is believed to be an innovation; it has been claimed to have been inserted in onsetless stressed syllables.

The Proto-Cerrado diphthongs *wa and *ja are believed to continue Proto-Jê monophthongs, which have been reconstructed as *ô and *ê₂. Other vowels which have been claimed to have innovated in Proto-Cerrado are:
*ô (goes back to an unrounded vowel, reconstructed as Proto-Jê *ə̂₁);
*u (a merger of earlier *u₁ and *u₂, distinguished in the Southern Jê languages as o and u, respectively);
*ũ (a merger of earlier *ũ₁ and *ũ₂, distinguished as ũ and ỹ in Kaingang and as ũ and õ in Laklãnõ);
*ə̃ (a merger of earlier *ə̃ and *ỹ, distinguished as ỹ and ĩ in Kaingang and as õ and ẽ in Laklãnõ);
all vowels in the Proto-Jê unstressed syllables of the shape *pV- were neutralized in the Cerrado languages: Proto-Cerrado *pᵊ- (> Proto-Goyaz Jê *py-/*pu-, Proto-Akuwẽ *pi-).

Sound changes from Proto-Cerrado to the daughter languages

Onsets
The simple onset inventory of Proto-Cerrado is */p m w t n ɾ c ɲ j k ŋ g/, and the only complex onsets are */pɾ mɾ kɾ ŋɾ/.

Their reflexes in the daughter branches are shown below.

Nuclei
The inventory of the Proto-Cerrado monophthongs is reconstructed as follows.

In addition, two diphthongs can be reconstructed, */wa/ and */ja/.

The following table shows the usual reflexes of the Proto-Cerrado nuclei in Proto-Goyaz Jê and in Proto-Akuwẽ. The latter group shows a chain vowel shift known as the Akuwẽ/Central Jê vowel shift.

Codas

References

Jê languages
Languages of Brazil